Palestina is a town in the south central region of the state of Caldas, Colombia. Located in the Triangle of Coffee Area, with a culture and tradition related to the colonization of Antioquia and the coffee growing. Because of this, the historic center of the town and surrounding rural areas were named part of the "Coffee Cultural Landscape" UNESCO World Heritage Site in 2011.  

Palestina's airport "Aeropuerto Internacional del Café", enables export cargo especially given the proximity to the city of Manizales (important industrial center), the diversity of agriculture and agribusiness in its area of influence – municipalities comprising the departments of Risaralda, Caldas, Quindio and the north of Valle del Cauca.

This town has very different climatic zones, because its territory is from the banks of the Cauca River, to the county seat located at the top of the mountain.

External links 
 Aeropuerto Internacional del Café International Airport of Palestina, Colombia
 Mayor of Palestina, Caldas, Colombia Palestina's Mayor
 Ecotourism in Palestina Palestina EcoHotel

References

Municipalities of Caldas Department